Cnemaspis wicksi is a species of gecko endemic to the Andaman Islands.

References

Cnemaspis
Reptiles described in 1873